Clara de noche (Clara at night), is a series of comic strips created in 1992 by comic book writers Carlos Trillo and Eduardo Maicas, and the cartoonist Jordi Bernet. It was published weekly in the Spanish magazine El Jueves, starting from number 772. After 1243 consecutive weeks of circulation, the series ended in 2015 in Spain. It had stopped the year before in Argentina (September 2014), where it was simultaneously published in a young persons supplement called No in the newspaper Página/12. Over 1,000 episodes of the comic strip were also published in the Italian magazine Skorpio. French, German, Greek and Croatian translations were also made. The series has been compiled periodically into albums, and is considered one of the most important works of the three creators.

The central character is the prostitute Clara, and the cartoon reflects her amusing adventures and misadventures as a sex worker, along with the peculiar characters that get involved with her and her son Pablito.

Description
Clara de noche was a humorous series of erotic cartoons. Initially it was produced in black and white but later in colour, and covered two pages. It recounts the adventures of an innocent prostitute, called Clara Fernandez, and her relationship with clients. Other characters include her very clever son Pablito and her friend Virtudes.  

Clara's physical appearance is clearly inspired by the famous American bondage model and pin-up, Bettie Page.

Controversy

Clara become one of the most well-known and loved characters of El Jueves, with a large following of fans who see in her the idealisation of a woman; a libertine, independent and attractive.

Despite this success in both in the Spanish and Argentine press, the comic had been the target of strong criticism and denunciations for alleged sexist and degrading content. However, over the years, the comic's appeal was strengthened and popularised within both the mainstream and also pop culture in these countries.

References

Bibliography

External links
 Archive of the comic strips

Spanish comics
1992 comics debuts
2015 comics endings
Fictional prostitutes
Female characters in comics
Erotic comics
Works about prostitution in Spain
Prostitution in comics
Obscenity controversies in comics